Edward F. Stein (September 5, 1869 – May 12, 1928) was a Major League Baseball player who pitched for the Chicago Colts and Brooklyn Grooms/Bridegrooms of the National League from  to .

Career

Chicago
Hailing from Detroit, Michigan, Stein began his major league career with the Colts, winning 12 of the 20 games he pitched as the team went on to a second-place finish behind the Brooklyn Bridegrooms. The following season, he pitched in fewer games, winning 7 of the 14 games he pitched that year, as the Colts again finished second, but this time behind the Boston Beaneaters.

Brooklyn
It was in Brooklyn where Stein enjoyed his greatest success. He made an immediate impact, winning 27 games that season, and 87 games total during his first four seasons in Brooklyn, including another 26 win season in 1894.

On June 2, 1894, Stein pitched a rain-shortened six inning no-hit game against the Beaneaters, a 1–0 victory at the Bridegrooms home field, Eastern Park. Do to subsequent rule changes since, it is not officially recognized as a no-hitter because he did not pitch at least nine innings.

Umpire
Stein was used as a substitute umpire for four games in his career. The first was on July 24, 1890. The second in 1894, and two more in 1896. In all of his games, he was the only umpire on the field.

Post-career
Stein died in his hometown of Detroit at the age of 58, and is interred at Elmwood Cemetery.

References

External links

1869 births
1928 deaths
Major League Baseball pitchers
Baseball players from Detroit
19th-century baseball players
Chicago Colts players
Brooklyn Grooms players
Brooklyn Bridegrooms players
Saginaw-Bay City Hyphens players
Omaha Lambs players
Major League Baseball umpires
19th-century baseball umpires
Burials at Elmwood Cemetery (Detroit)